WPEL may refer to:

 WPEL (AM), a radio station (800 AM) licensed to Montrose, Pennsylvania, United States
 WPEL-FM, a radio station (96.5 FM) licensed to Montrose, Pennsylvania, United States
 Wikipedia:External links